Trafalgar railway station was between Sion Mills railway station and Victoria Bridge railway station in  County Tyrone in Northern Ireland.

It was a private station. The opening and closing dates are not known.

Routes

References

Disused railway stations in County Tyrone